Gavelinellidae is a family of foraminifera belonging to the superfamily Chilostomelloidea and the order Rotaliida. It is found in marine sediments of the Barremian (early Cretaceous) and exists into the present-day (Holocene).

Genera
The family Gavelinellidae consists of the following genera:
 Subfamilia Gavelinellinae
 † Angulogavelinella
 Anomalinulla
 † Asianella
 † Berthelina
 † Bilingulogavelinella
 † Boldia
 Cocoarota
 † Conorbinoides
 Echigoina
 † Gavelinella
 † Globogyroidina
 Gyroidella
 Gyroidina
 Gyroidinopsis
 Hansenisca
 † Hollandina
 † Holmanella
 † Lingulogavelinella
 † Lingulogavelinelloides
 † Notoplanulina
 † Paralabamina
 † Pilleussella
 † Primanomalina
 † Pseudogavelinella
 † Sliterella
 Subfamily Gyroidinoidinae
 † Escornebovina
 † Nummodiscorbis
 † Rotaliatina
 Rotaliatinopsis
 † Saitoella
 † Scarificatina
 † Sliteria

References

External links

Foraminiferida

Foraminifera families
Globothalamea